Farmen 2019 (The Farm 2019) was the fifteenth season of the Norwegian version of The Farm reality television show. The show premiered on 24 September 2019 on TV2 and ended on 10 December 2019.

Format
Fourteen contestants are chosen from the outside world. Each week one contestant is selected the Farmer of the Week. In the first week, the contestants choose the Farmer. Since week 2, the Farmer is chosen by the contestant evicted in the previous week.

Nomination process
The Farmer of the Week nominates two people (a man and a woman) as the Butlers. The others must decide which Butler is the first to go to the Battle. That person then chooses the second person (from the same sex) for the Battle and also the type of battle (a quiz, extrusion, endurance, sleight). The Battle winner must win two duels. The Battle loser is evicted from the game.

Finishing order
(ages stated are at time of contest)

Torpet 
After the contestants are eliminated, they are taken to Torpet where they'll be given a second chance to try and re-enter the competition. In addition, 3 new contestants start off on Torpet, hoping to get into the Farm themselves.

Challengers 
On the fourth week, four challengers come to the farm where they live for two weeks while doing chores and getting to know the other contestants. At the end of the two weeks, the contestants on the farm decide which two are allowed to stay on the farm. The others are eliminated and sent home.

The game

References

External links

The Farm (franchise)
Norwegian reality television series
2019 Norwegian television seasons